The 1973 Cork Senior Hurling Championship was the 85th staging of the Cork Senior Hurling Championship since its establishment by the Cork County Board in 1887. The draw for the opening fixtures took place on 28 January 1973. The championship began on 8 April 1973 ended on 14 October 1973.

Glen Rovers entered the championship as the defending champions.

The final was played on 14 October 1973 at the Athletic Grounds in Cork, between Blackrock and Glen Rovers, in what was their first meeting in the final in 14 years. Blackrock won the match by 2-12 to 2-10 to claim their 25th championship title overall and a first title in two years.

Tom Buckley was the championship's top scorer with 2-22.

Format

At the Cork County Convention on 28 January 1973, it was decided to introduce a system of seeding. As a result of this the four semi-finalists from the 1972 championship were automatically guaranteed a place in the second round.

Team changes

To Championship

Promoted from the Cork Intermediate Hurling Championship
 Mallow

Results

First round

Second round

Quarter-finals

Semi-finals

Final

Championship statistics

Top scorers

Top scorers overall

Top scorers in a single game

Miscellaneous

 The final is the last to be played at the Cork Athletic Grounds.

References

Cork Senior Hurling Championship
Cork Senior Hurling Championship